Victory is a surname. Notable people with the surname include:

Craig Victory (born 1980), Australian field hockey striker
Ebrahim Victory (born 1933), Iranian-American Scientist
Fiona Victory (born 1952), Irish actress
Gerard Victory (1921–1995), Irish composer
Grace Victory (born 1990), British Youtuber
James Victory (1880–1946),  Irish politician and farmer
Jamie Victory (born 1975), English footballer
Jeffrey P. Victory (born 1946), Louisiana Supreme Court justice